Nathan McSweeney (born 8 March 1999) is an Australian cricketer who plays for South Australia. He plays for Norths in grade cricket.

He made his first-class debut for Queensland in the 2018–19 Sheffield Shield season on 16 October 2018. Prior to his first-class debut, he was named in Australia's squad for the 2018 Under-19 Cricket World Cup. In the Under-19 Cricket World Cup, he scored a match-winning 156 runs against Papua New Guinea.

He made his Twenty20 debut on 25 January 2020, for the Melbourne Renegades in the 2019–20 Big Bash League season. He made his List A debut on 22 September 2021, for South Australia in the 2021–22 Marsh One-Day Cup.

References

External links
 

1999 births
Living people
Australian cricketers
Place of birth missing (living people)
South Australia cricketers
Queensland cricketers
Melbourne Renegades cricketers
Brisbane Heat cricketers